The National Midget Auto Racing Hall of Fame is an American Hall of Fame and museum for midget cars. The Hall of Fame is located at Angell Park Speedway in Sun Prairie, Wisconsin, and can be accessed during weekly Sunday races during the summer. Inductees are often honored with their award in January at the Chili Bowl at Tulsa.

List of inductees
There were 254 inductees after the 2021 induction ceremony.

References

Midget car racing
Auto racing museums and halls of fame
Automobile museums in Wisconsin
Sports museums in Wisconsin
Midget Auto
Museums in Dane County, Wisconsin